Valentin Dartilov (born 14 August 1967) is a former Bulgarian footballer who was deployed as a defender.

Career
Dartilov played 148 A PFG matches and scored 1 goal for Levski Sofia between 1990 and 1997, winning three consecutive league titles (1993-1995) and three Bulgarian Cups with the team. In European club tournaments, he has 10 matches and 1 goal under his belt. Considered one of the top defenders in the Balkans at the time, in 1992 he went close to being transferred to Fenerbahçe in neighbouring Turkey.

References

External links
 

1967 births
Living people
Bulgarian footballers
Bulgaria youth international footballers
Bulgaria international footballers
Bulgarian expatriate footballers
Association football defenders
OFC Pirin Blagoevgrad players
FC Hebar Pazardzhik players
PFC Levski Sofia players
Kayserispor footballers
First Professional Football League (Bulgaria) players
Süper Lig players
Expatriate footballers in Turkey